Adrian Szabo (born 17 June 1960 in Brașov) is a Romanian football manager and former footballer.

References

External links

Adrian Szabo at fcbrasov.ro 
Adrian Szabo: Am o şansă unică, vreau să profit at ProSport.ro 

Living people
1960 births
Romanian footballers
FC Brașov (1936) players
Romanian football managers
Romanian expatriate football managers
Expatriate football managers in Iran
Romanian expatriate sportspeople in Iran
FC Brașov (1936) managers
CSM Corona Brașov (football) managers
Association football midfielders
Sportspeople from Brașov